Jan Kochanowski (1530 – 22 August 1584) was a Polish Renaissance poet, writing in Polish and Latin, who established poetic patterns that would become integral to Polish literary language. He is commonly regarded as the greatest Polish poet before Adam Mickiewicz and the most important Slavic poet before the 19th century.

He is most famous for his Polish-language Treny (Laments) – elegies on the death of his daughter Urszula – regarded as masterpieces of form and style; the drama Odprawa posłów greckich (The Dismissal of the Greek Envoys; the satire Zgoda; and Fraszki (Epigrams).

Life
Jan Kochanowski was born at Sycyna, near Radom, Kingdom of Poland, to a Polish noble (szlachta) family of the Korwin coat of arms. His father, was a judge in the Sandomierz area; his mother, was of the Odrowąż family.

Little is known of Jan Kochanowski's early education. At fourteen, in 1544, he was sent to the Kraków Academy. Later, around 1551-52, he attended the University of Königsberg, in Ducal Prussia (a fiefdom of the Crown of the Kingdom of Poland); then, from 1552 to the late 1550s, Padua University in Italy. At Padua, Kochanowski studied classical philology and came in contact with the humanist scholar Francesco Robortello. During his "Padua period", he traveled back and forth between Italy and Poland at least twice, returning to Poland to secure funding and attend his mother's funeral. Kochanowski closed his fifteen-year period of studies and travels with a visit to France, where he visited Marseilles and Paris and met the poet Pierre de Ronsard.

In 1559 Kochanowski returned for good to Poland, where he was active as a humanist and Renaissance poet. He spent the next fifteen years as a courtier, though little is known about the first few years of his activities on return to Poland. Around 1562–63 he was a courtier to Bishop  and Voivode Jan Firlej. From late 1563 or early 1564 he was affiliated with the court of King Sigismund II Augustus, serving the King as one of the royal secretaries. During that time he received two benefices (incomes from parishes). In 1567 he accompanied the King during an episode of the Livonian War: a show of force near Radashkovichy.

From 1571 Kochanowski spent increasing time at a family estate at Czarnolas, near Lublin. In 1574, following the decampment of Poland's recently elected King Henry of Valois (whose candidacy to the Polish throne Kochanowski had supported), Kochanowski settled in Czarnolas to lead the life of a country squire. In 1575 he married , a daughter of Sejm deputy Stanisław Lupa Podlodowski, with whom he had seven children. At Czarnolas, following the death of his daughter Ursula, which affected him greatly, he wrote one of his most memorable works, Treny (the Laments).

Kochanowski died, probably of a heart attack, in Lublin on 22 August 1584, aged 54. He was buried in a crypt in a parish church in Zwoleń.

Works

Kochanowski's earliest known work may be the Polish-language Pieśń o potopie, which some scholars think may have been composed as early as 1550. His first printed work, considered his first publication, is the 1558 Latin-language , an epitaph dedicated to his recently deceased colleague, . Kochanowski's works from his youthful Padua period comprised mostly elegies, epigrams, and odes.

The latter has been described as the first Polish-language "humorous epic or herocomic poem". 

Some of his works can be seen as journalistic commentaries from an era before journalism existed, expressing views of the royal court and aimed at the members of the parliament (the Sejm) and the voters. This period also saw the creation of most of his merry Fraszki (Epigrams) reminiscent of Giovanni Boccaccio's Decameron. They have been described as among Kochanowski's most popular writings, and spawned many imitators in Poland. Czesław Miłosz calls them a sort of "very personal diary, but one where the personality of the author never appears in the foreground". Another of his works from that time is the non-poetic political-commentary dialogue, . 

A major work from that period was Odprawa posłów greckich (The Dismissal of the Greek Envoys, written ca. 1565-66 and first published and performed in 1578; translated into English in 2007 by Bill Johnston as The Envoys). This was a blank-verse tragedy that recounted an incident, modeled after Homer, leading up to the Trojan War. It was the first tragedy written in Polish, and its theme of the responsibilities of statesmanship continues to resonate to this day. The play was performed on 12 January 1578 in Warsaw's Ujazdów Castle at the wedding of Jan Zamoyski and Krystyna Radziwiłł. Czesław Miłosz calls it "the finest specimen of Polish humanist drama".

Another of Kochanowski's works commonly described as masterpieces is his Treny (Threnodies, usually rendered in English as Laments, 1580), a series of nineteen elegies on the death of his beloved two-and-a-half-year-old daughter Urszulka (the diminutive for "Ursula"). In 1920 it was translated into English by Dorothea Prall, and in 1995 by Stanisław Barańczak and Seamus Heaney. As in the case of his light-hearted Fraszki, it has been described as enduringly popular and as the wellspring of a new genre in Polish literature. Milosz writes that "Kochanowski's poetic art reached its highest achievements in the Laments". Kochanowski's innovation, which Miłosz describes as "something unique in... world literature... a whole cycle... centered around the main theme", scandalized some of the poet's contemporary peers, as it applied a classic form to a personal sorrow, and to an "insignificant" subject – a young child.

Also highly regarded was Kochanowski's poetic translation of the Psalms, Psalterz Dawidów (David's Psalter, 1579).  By the mid-18th century alone, it had gone through at least 25 editions and, set to music, became an enduring element of Polish church masses and folklore. It also became one of his more influential works on the international scene, translated into Russian by Symeon of Polotsk and into, among other languages, Romanian, German, Lithuanian, Czech, and Slovak. 

His Pieśni, written throughout his life and collected and published posthumously in 1586, have been described as reflecting Italian lyricism and "his attachment to antiquity", in particular to Horace, and as being highly influential for Polish poetry. 

Another unique work was Kochanowski's historical treatise , a critical analysis of Slavic myths, with a focus on the titular origin myth about Lech, Czech, and Rus'.

His notable Latin works include  (Little Book of Lyrics, 1580),  (Four Books of Elegies, 1584), and numerous poems composed for special occasions. His Latin poems were translated into Polish by Kazimierz Brodziński in 1829, and by Władysław Syrokomla in 1851.

In addition to creating works of his own, Kochanowski translated into Polish a number of Greek and Roman classics, such as the Phenomena of Aratus and fragments of Homer's Illiad.

In some of his works, Kochanowski used Polish alexandrines, wherein each line comprises thirteen syllables, with a caesura following the seventh syllable.

Views 

Details of Kochanowski's life are sparse; they come mostly from his own writings, and he wrote little about himself. Like many persons of his time he was deeply religious, and a number of his works are religious-themed. However, he avoided taking sides in the strife between the Catholic Church and the Protestant denominations; he stayed on friendly terms with figures of both Christian currents, and his poetry was viewed as acceptable by both.

Importance 
Kochanowski is commonly regarded as the greatest Polish poet before Adam Mickiewicz.  writes that Kochanowski is generally viewed as the greatest poet not only of Poland but of any Slavic country until the advent of 19th-century poets such as Adam Mickiewicz and Juliusz Słowacki in Poland and Alexander Pushkin in Russia. He also argues that Kochanowski both created modern Polish poetry and introduced it to the general European culture. 

Similarly Czesław Miłosz writes that "until the beginning of the nineteenth century, the most eminent Slavic poet was undoubtedly Jan Kochanowski", and that he "set the pace for the whole subsequent development of Polish poetry". Norman Davies names Kochanowski as the second most important figure of the Polish Renaissance, after Copernicus. Kochanowski, writes Davies, can be seen as "the founder of Polish vernacular poetry [who] showed the Poles the beauty of their language." 

Kochanowski never ceased writing in Latin. However, his main achievement was the creation of Polish-language verse forms that made him a classic for his contemporaries and posterity. He greatly enriched Polish poetry by naturalizing foreign poetic forms, which he knew how to imbue with a national spirit.

Remembrance 

Kochanowski has been the subject of a variety of artistic works – literary, musical, and visual. Jan Matejko portrayed him in a painting, Kochanowski nad zwłokami Urszulki ("Kochanowski and his deceased daughter Ursula"). Kochanowski and his writings have also received scholarly treatments. 

Most of the recognition of his achievements has come from Polish-language artists and scholars; he has been described as little-known in English-language – and generally in non-Slavic-language – works; and, as of the early 1980s, had been passed over or given short shrift in many reference works – though, as early as 1894, Encyclopedia Britannica called him "the prince of Polish poets". The first English-language monograph devoted to him was published in 1974 by David Welsh.

Czesław Miłosz writes that Kochanowski's first published collection of poems was his David's Psalter (printed 1579). That series included works from his Padua period, and his Fraszki (Epigrams). In 1884 a jubilee volume was published in Warsaw. 

Many of Kochanowski's poems were translated into German in 1875 by H. Nitschmann. As of the mid-1980s, the only English-language collection had been published in 1928 (translations by George R. Noyes et al.). Since then, several more translations have appeared, including The Laments translated by Stanisław Barańczak and Seamus Heaney (1995) and The Envoys translated by Bill Johnston (2007).

A  was opened in 1961.

See also
 List of Poles
 Political fiction
 Sapphic stanza in Polish poetry

References

Further reading
 David J. Welsh, Jan Kochanowski, New York, Twayne Publishers, 1974, 
 Barry Keane, The Dismissal of the Greek Envoys. A Verse Translation with Introduction and Commentary. Wydawnictwo Naukowe Sub Lupa: Warsaw, 2018 .

External links
 
 
 Digitized works by Jan Kochanowski in Polish Digital National Library
 
 
 
Works by Kochanowski with commentary at WolneLektury.pl
Selection of translated poems
Translations of Jan Kochanowski  by Teresa Bałuk-Ulewiczowa
Translations of Jan Kochanowski by Michał J. Mikoś
Jan Kochanowski at culture.pl
Jan Kochanowski collected works (Polish)

1530 births
1584 deaths
16th-century Latin-language writers
16th-century Polish poets
Jagiellonian University alumni
University of Padua alumni
16th-century Polish dramatists and playwrights
Polish male dramatists and playwrights
Polish Roman Catholics
16th-century Polish nobility
Polish translators
New Latin-language poets
Renaissance writers
University of Königsberg alumni
Polish male poets